Pain aux raisins, also called escargot or pain russe, is a spiral pastry often eaten for breakfast in France. Its names translate as "raisin bread", "snail" and "Russian bread" respectively. It is a member of the pâtisserie viennoise family of baked foods.

In France, it is typically a variant of the croissant or pain au chocolat, made with a leavened butter pastry with raisins added and shaped in a spiral with a crème pâtissière filling. However, in many areas of Northern Europe and North America, it is generally made with sweetened bread dough or brioche dough, rather than pastry. It is often consumed for breakfast as part of a continental breakfast.

In Paris, the name pain aux raisins is also used for a type of raisin bread – a loaf of bread made from wheat or rye and stuffed with raisins.

See also

Schnecken
Chelsea bun
Cinnamon roll
Danish pastry

References

Foods featuring butter
French pastries
Sweet breads